Oscar Gjøslien (also spelled Gjoeslien, November 9, 1909 – May 20, 1995) was a Norwegian cross-country skier who competed during the 1930s.

He won a bronze medal at the 1939 FIS Nordic World Ski Championships in the 50 km. In 1935, Gjøslien won the 50 km cross-country skiing event at the Holmenkollen ski festival. Because of his successes, Gjøslien was awarded the Holmenkollen medal in 1940 (shared with Annar Ryen).

Cross-country skiing results
All results are sourced from the International Ski Federation (FIS).

World Championships
 1 medal – (1 bronze)

References

Holmenkollen medalists - click Holmenkollmedaljen for downloadable pdf file 
Holmenkollen winners since 1892 - click Vinnere for downloadable pdf file

External links
 

1909 births
1995 deaths
Norwegian male cross-country skiers
FIS Nordic World Ski Championships medalists in cross-country skiing
Holmenkollen medalists
Holmenkollen Ski Festival winners